The Brazilian Ice Sports Federation (CBDG) was founded by Eric Maleson, Brazil's first bobsled athlete. The CBDG was established in 1996 and affiliated to the Brazilian Olympic Committee in 1999. The federation qualified 7 athletes for the 2002 Winter Olympics in Salt Lake City, Utah (5 bobsled athletes and 2 luge athletes) and a 4-man bobsled team for the 2006 Winter Olympics in Torino.

The federation is responsible for the development of all winter Olympic ice sport modalities for Brazil including bobsled, skeleton, luge, figure, long track and short track speed skating, curling, and ice hockey.

Curling
The Brazilian Ice Sports Federation made curling history in August 2008 when they challenged the United States for a berth at the World Curling Championship. This was the first time any South American team has offered a challenge to the United States for a berth in the World Curling Championship. The players involved trained in Lennoxville, Quebec and included Luis Silva, Marcelo De Mello, Celso Kossaka and Cesar Santos. See 2009 USA-Brazil Challenge. The Brazilian team were unsuccessful, losing the challenge 3 games to none.

National teams
Men's national team
National inline hockey team

Participation by year
2017

References

External links
IIHF profile
CBDG official website 

Ice sports
 
Bobsleigh governing bodies
 
Luge governing bodies
 
Skeleton governing bodies
Curling in Brazil
Curling governing bodies
Figure skating in Brazil
 
International Skating Union
Brazil
 
Ice hockey governing bodies in South America
International Ice Hockey Federation members
Ice sports
Sports organizations established in 1984